Josef Šural (30 May 1990 – 29 April 2019) was a Czech professional footballer who played as a forward.

Career
In June 2011, Šural together with his Zbrojovka Brno teammate Michael Rabušic signed a three-year contract with Gambrinus liga side Slovan Liberec.

On 13 January 2016, he transferred to AC Sparta Prague.

He moved to Turkish side Alanyaspor in January 2019.

Šural played 20 international games and scored one goal. He was a part of the national team that played in Euro 2016 in France, and finished as the last of their group. Šural played in the three games as a substitute, and received a yellow card in the last game against Turkey.

Death
Šural died on 29 April 2019 after being critically injured when a minibus transporting him and six other players crashed  from Alanya. Šural and his teammates were taken to a hospital after the crash. Šural was in critical condition and was pronounced dead shortly afterwards from his injuries. Steven Caulker, Papiss Cissé and four other players were reportedly also on the bus but were not in critical condition after surviving the crash.

Career statistics

International

International goal
Scores and results list the Czech Republic's goal tally first, score column indicates score after Šural goal.

Honours
 Slovan Liberec
Gambrinus liga: 2011–12
Czech Cup: 2014–15

References

External links
 
 
 
 

1990 births
2019 deaths
People from Hustopeče
Association football forwards
Czech footballers
Czech Republic international footballers
Czech Republic youth international footballers
Czech First League players
Süper Lig players
FC Zbrojovka Brno players
FC Slovan Liberec players
AC Sparta Prague players
Alanyaspor footballers
UEFA Euro 2016 players
Expatriate footballers in Turkey
Czech expatriate sportspeople in Turkey
Road incident deaths in Turkey
Sportspeople from the South Moravian Region